Lyctocoridae is a reconstituted family of bugs, formerly classified within the minute pirate bugs of the family Anthocoridae. It is widely distributed, with one species (Lyctocoris campestris), being cosmopolitan.

Description 
Lyctocoridae range in length from 2 mm to 6 mm. They have tarsi 3-segmented, forewing with a costal fracture and with weakly developed veins in the membrane, laterotergites on all abdominal terga, and male genitalia strongly asymmetrical (left paramere larger than the right).

Overall they resemble the related family Anthocoridae, but can be distinguished by:

 In males, the left paramere is flat, with a single-sheet form, and without a median sulcus. The phallus is tubular and well visible, with ductus seminis striated transversely and extended apically by a needle-shaped acus.
 In females, there are genital apophyses in the anterior region of abdominal sternum 7.

Diet 
Lyctocoridae are mostly predators of small, soft-bodied arthropods, though L. campestris occasionally feeds on mammal (including human) blood and L. ichikawai is only known to feed on sap of sawtooth oak (Quercus acutissima). Adults and nymphs have similar diets.

Habitat 
This family of bugs occurs under tree bark and in decaying plant matter, animal nests and burrows, manure piles, poultry houses, granaries and stored food products.

Reproduction 
Lyctocoridae practice traumatic insemination in which the male pierces the female (using the acus of his phallus) between terga 7 and 8 on the right side of her abdomen. The male's sperm migrate through the haemocoel or through specialized structures in the female to the ovaries, then fertilise the eggs within the vitellarium.

Biological control 
Some species of Lyctocoridae are biological control agents that feed on pest insects. Xylocoris and Lyctocoris attack beetle and moth pests in stored food products, and these genera along with Scoloposcelis attack bark beetle pests.

Systematics
Recent phylogenetic work supports the treatment of Lyctocoridae as a family separate from Anthocoridae.

Genera
BioLib lists a single subfamily Lyctocorinae Reuter, 1884:
 Lyctocoris Hahn, 1836 (in monotypic tribe Lyctocorini Reuter, 1884)
 Astemmocoris Carayon & Usinger, 1965

Placed elsewhere
Many of these are placed in the Anthocorinae tribes Cardiastethini and Scolopini:
 Alofa Herring, 1976
 Amphiareus Distant, 1904
 Brachysteles Mulsant & Rey, 1852
 Buchananiella Reuter, 1884
 Calliodis Reuter, 1871
 Cardiastethus Fieber, 1860
 Dufouriellus Kirkaldy, 1906
 Dysepicritus Reuter, 1885
 Nidicola Harris and Drake, 1941
 Orthosoleniopsis Poppius, 1909
 Physopleurella Reuter, 1884
 Scoloposcelis Fieber, 1864
 Solenonotus Reuter, 1871
 Xylocoridea Reuter, 1876
 Xyloecocoris Reuter, 1879

References

External links

 
Cimicomorpha
Heteroptera families